Rothschild Boulevard (Sderot Rotshild) is one of the principal streets in the center of Tel Aviv, Israel, beginning in Neve Tzedek at its southwestern edge and running north to Habima Theatre. It is one of the most expensive streets in the city, being one of the city's main tourist attractions.  It features a wide, tree-lined central strip with pedestrian and bike lanes.

History

 
Rothschild Boulevard is one of the oldest streets in Tel Aviv; soon after its creation, residents requested it to be renamed in honor of Baron Edmond James de Rothschild. One house, on the corner of Rothschild Boulevard and Herzl Street, was built in 1909 by the Eliavson family, one of Tel Aviv's sixty founding families. In 2007, the building was purchased and restored by the French Institute.

Israel's Declaration of Independence was signed at Independence Hall on Rothschild Boulevard. Many of the historic buildings are built in the Bauhaus or International style, forming part of the White City of Tel Aviv, a UNESCO-designated World Heritage Site.
The 1925 Lederberg house, at the intersection of  Allenby Street features a series of large ceramic murals designed by Ze'ev Raban a member of the Bezalel school.  The four murals show a Jewish pioneer sowing and harvesting, a shepherd and Jerusalem, with a verse from Jeremiah 31:4, "Again I will rebuild thee and thou shalt be rebuilt."

In 1995, the municipality held an architectural competition to design avenues. The architect Moti Bodek suggested using existing avenues ring as a backbone system consists of pedestrian ways and bicycle paths, target the urban activities of leisure sports and recreation along with restoration and rehabilitation of historic kiosks.  The Boulevard is an arts district, with galleries including Alon Segev Gallery, Rothschild49 Art Gallery and Sommer Contemporary Art.

In 2013, Absolut Vodka introduced a specially designed bottle dedicated to Tel Aviv as part of its international cities series. The design, commemorating Tel Aviv's ficus tree boulevards, was inspired by the night landscape of Rothschild, Nordau and Chen boulevards.

Financial center

Rothschild Boulevard is at the heart of Tel Aviv's financial district. It is where the First International Bank Tower is located, as well as the Israel offices of HSBC Bank. From the 1960s through the 1980s the boulevard suffered from urban decay. By 2005 the boulevard had undergone a dramatic transformation as historic buildings were restored and residents began flowing back in and injecting the street with a renewed cultural energy. In February 2012 Bloomberg L.P. opened an office on the boulevard, followed by Julius Baer Group in March of the same year.
Rothschild Boulevard was the epicenter of the 2011 Israeli social justice protests.

See also
 Rothschild 22

References

External links

 Peace demonstration on Rothschild Boulevard, June 6, 2008

Streets in Tel Aviv
Boulevards
Shopping districts and streets in Israel
Edmond James de Rothschild